Volleyball at the 2015 African Games was held from September 4–14, 2015 at several venues.

Events

Schedule

Medal summary

Medal table

References

External links
 Men's Results
 Women's Results

 
Volleyball at the African Games
A
2015 African Games